Giovonnie Lavette Samuels (born November 13, 1985) is an American actress and voice artist best known for her role as Nia Moseby in The Suite Life of Zack & Cody and for being a series regular on All That (where she was replaced by Kianna Underwood who replaced Jamie Lynn Spears on All That in 2005).

Life and career
Samuels was born in San Diego, California. She began appearing on All That during 2002, quickly becoming one of the most regularly featured actresses on the show, alongside Jamie Lynn Spears and others. Samuels also appeared in episodes of That's So Raven as Raven's cousin, Betty Jane. She also appeared on Boston Public.

Samuels has also done voiceover work for Bill Cosby's animated show, Fatherhood, on Nick at Nite. In 2006, she appeared in the movie Bring It On: All or Nothing, the third  Bring It On movie. She has also appeared as an extra in Raven-Symoné's "Backflip" video and in the 2007 film Freedom Writers. In addition, Samuels has appeared in the movie Christmas At Water's Edge. In July 2007, she began appearing as a recurring character on The Suite Life of Zack & Cody as Nia Moseby, niece of Marion Moseby (Samuels was the replacement of Ashley Tisdale, who was absent due to filming High School Musical 2). In 2012, she had a recurring role as Camille in the series Mr. Box Office.

Filmography

Film

Television

External links

1985 births
21st-century American actresses
Actresses from San Diego
Living people
American television actresses
African-American actresses
American film actresses
American voice actresses
American child actresses
21st-century African-American women
21st-century African-American people
20th-century African-American people
20th-century African-American women